Lititz  is a borough in Lancaster County, Pennsylvania, United States,  north of the city of Lancaster. As of the 2020 census, it had a population of 9,370.

History

Lititz was founded by members of the Moravian Church in 1756 and was named after a castle in Bohemia near the village of Kunvald where the ancient Bohemian Brethren's Church had been founded in 1457. The roots of the Moravian Brethren's Church date back to the ancient Bohemian Brethren's Church. It was one of the four leading Moravian communities in the Northeastern United States (Bethlehem, Emmaus and Nazareth, each in Pennsylvania, were the three others). 

For a century, only Moravians were permitted to live in Lititz. Until the middle of the 19th century, only members of the congregation could own houses; others were required to lease. The lease system was abolished in 1855, just five years before the beginning of the Civil War. More information can be found in the book A Brief History of Lititz Pennsylvania by Mary Augusta Huevener, published in 1947.

During a part of the American Revolution, the Brethren's House, built in 1759, was used as a hospital. A number of soldiers died and were buried here. Lititz is also home to Linden Hall School, the oldest all-girls boarding school in the United States.

Geography
Lititz Run flows through the downtown from Lititz Springs Park toward the Conestoga River,  to the southeast.

Lititz has a hot-summer humid continental climate (Dfa) and average monthly temperatures range from 30.1 °F in January to 74.7 °F in July.  The local hardiness zone is 6b.

Demographics

As of the census of 2000, there were 9,029 people, 3,732 households, and 2,407 families residing in the borough. There were 3,827 housing units at an average density of  1,646.2 per square mile (636.9/km2). The racial makeup of the borough was 97.23% White, 0.44% African American, 0.09% Native American, 0.87% Asian, 0.03% Pacific Islander, 0.50% from other races, and 0.83% from two or more races. Hispanic or Latino of any race were 1.52% of the population.

There were 3,732 households, out of which 29.1% had children under the age of 18 living with them, 52.9% were married couples living together, 8.5% had a female householder with no husband present, and 35.5% were non-families. 31.0% of all households were made up of individuals, and 15.8% had someone living alone who was 65 years of age or older. The average household size was 2.32 and the average family size was 2.91.

In the borough the population was spread out, with 23.0% under the age of 18, 6.1% from 18 to 24, 28.8% from 25 to 44, 20.9% from 45 to 64, and 21.2% who were 65 years of age or older. The median age was 40 years. For every 100 females, there were 86.4 males. For every 100 females age 18 and over, there were 82.2 males.

The median income for a household in the borough was $40,417, and the median income for a family was $52,028. Males had a median income of $36,126 versus $25,997 for females. The per capita income for the borough was $20,601. About 2.6% of families and 4.1% of the population were below the poverty line, including 3.9% of those under age 18 and 8.7% of those age 65 or over.

Economy
Lititz-based Woodstream manufactures mousetraps under the Victor brand name. Mousetraps have been produced in Lititz since 1899.

Rock Lititz, a company specializing in rock concert production, is headquartered and has a show production stage in Lititz. The facility attracts international artists and supports music production suppliers in the area.

Arts and culture

Annual events include:
 Independence Day event, founded in 1813, which includes a Queen of Candles Pageant and fireworks.
 Summer art show.
 Microbrewery festival.
 Fire and Ice Festival each February, featuring food trucks, entertainment, and ice carvings.

The Lititz Public Library is a member of the Library System of Lancaster County.

Museums and historic sites
Gravesite of John A. Sutter
Heritage Map Museum
Johannes Mueller House
Julius Sturgis Pretzel Bakery
Lititz Springs Park
Wilbur Chocolate Factory and Candy Americana Museum
John Beck's Boys Academy
Johann Agust Sutter House
William Werner House
Lititz Moravian Historic District

Government

Mayor: Timothy R. Snyder (R)
Borough Manager: Sue Ann Barry
Borough Council
Shane Weaver, President
J. Andrew Greiner
Stephen Lee
Christine Sensenich
Ken Mobley
David Brubaker

Education
Lititz, along with Elizabeth and Warwick townships and part of Penn Township, is located in the Warwick School District.  Schools located in Lititz include:
Warwick High School
Warwick Middle School
Lititz Elementary School (at former site of K-12 Lititz High School; serves the central and northern part of Lititz borough and western Warwick township out to Penn township and its border with Manheim Central School District)
John Beck Elementary School (founded independently of the district and incorporated; serves the northern part of Warwick township and Elizabeth township)
John R. Bonfield Elementary School (serves the eastern part of the school district, including the outskirts of Lititz borough and Warwick township)
Kissel Hill Elementary School (serves the southern part of Lititz borough and Warwick township south to the Manheim Township line)
Linden Hall School for Girls (the oldest all-girls private school in the country)

Infrastructure

Transportation
Pennsylvania Routes 772 (West Orange and East Main streets) and 501 (Broad Street) run through Lititz.

The Reading and Columbia Railroad operated passenger service through downtown Lititz until 1952. Norfolk Southern continues to operate freight service to Lancaster, while the line between Lititz and Ephrata has been converted into a rail trail. A replica of the Lititz Depot was constructed at its former location in Lititz Springs Park in 1999, along with a small museum in a Reading caboose.

Bus service in Lititz is provided by Red Rose Transit Route 10, the successor of the Conestoga Traction Company trolley line to Lancaster along the Lititz Pike.

Notable people
John Fass (1890–1973), book designer, printer, photographer
Matt Greiner, metalcore drummer for August Burns Red
Mary Penry (1735–1804), Moravian sister
Richard A. Snyder (1910–1992), Pennsylvania state senator
Johann August Sutter (1803–1880), pioneer of California
Louise Adeline Weitzel (1862–1934), poet
Joey Welz (born 1940), musician; former pianist for Bill Haley & His Comets
Andrew Wenger (born 1990), Hermann Trophy winner and professional soccer player for the Philadelphia Union

Sister city

A sister city relationship between Lititz and Kunvald (Czech Republic) was established on June 11, 2006, during the celebration of the 250th anniversary naming of Lititz. The ceremony took place in Lititz Springs Park. Their Pennsylvania sister city is Emmaus in Lehigh County.

See also
Lititz Watch Technicum
The Hess Homestead

References

Further reading
 Moravian Historical Society Transactions, volume ii, (Bethlehem, Pa.)
 Mombert, An Authentic History of Lancaster County, Pa., (Lancaster, 1869)

External links

 
Populated places established in 1710
History of the America (North) Province of the Moravian Church
Boroughs in Lancaster County, Pennsylvania
Moravian settlement in Pennsylvania
1756 establishments in Pennsylvania